Miroslav Vučetić (born 8 August 1976) is a Croatian swimmer. He competed in five events at the 1996 Summer Olympics. He was an All-America swimmer four years during his college career at Syracuse University. He was named Big East's Male Swimmer of the Year.

References

1976 births
Living people
Croatian male swimmers
Olympic swimmers of Croatia
Swimmers at the 1996 Summer Olympics
Sportspeople from Split, Croatia
Syracuse Orange men's swimmers